is a professional Japanese baseball player. He plays pitcher for the Chunichi Dragons.

A native of Fukui prefecture, Hashimoto went to high school at Ogaki Nihon University High School in Gifu Prefecture where he appeared with the team at the Japanese High School Baseball Championship. Hashimoto later enrolled at Osaka University of Commerce where he threw a no-hitter in the Kansai6 Baseball League.

On 17 October 2019, Hashimoto was selected as the 2nd draft pick for the Chunichi Dragons at the 2019 NPB Draft and on 20 November signed a provisional contract with a ¥80,000,000 sign-on bonus and a ¥12,000,000 yearly salary.

References

1998 births
Living people
Baseball people from Fukui Prefecture
Japanese baseball players
Nippon Professional Baseball pitchers
Chunichi Dragons players